Rhynocoris albopunctatus is a species of assassin bug family (Reduviidae), in the subfamily Harpactorinae. It is common in cotton plantations, especially near pastures where Stylosanthes gracilis is incorporated.

Life history
Rhynocoris albopunctatus preys upon larvae of Heliothis armigera (Hübner), Earias biplaga Walker, and Earias insulana Boisduval.

References

Reduviidae
Insects described in 1855
Taxa named by Carl Stål